St Peter and St Paul's Church, Shelford is a parish church in the Church of England in Shelford, Nottinghamshire.

The church is Grade II* listed by the Department for Digital, Culture, Media and Sport.

History

The church is of medieval style and era but was heavily restored between 1876 and 1878 by Ewan Christian. The tower of the church was used by then Royalists during the siege of Shelford Manor during the English Civil War, but they were eventually defeated out by Parliamentarian forces.

It is now part of the united parish of St Mary's Church, Radcliffe on Trent.

Stained glass

There is stained glass in the chancel by Charles Eamer Kempe and in the north aisle by Alexander Gascoyne.

Organ

The earliest mentions of organs is from 1835 when one is recorded in the churchwardens accounts. A new organ was purchased in 1855 from Henry Bevington of London. This was kept until the end of the 20th century. The current organ was acquired from St Catharine's Church, Nottingham in 2003. It was installed in the church by Henry Groves & Son in 2004.

Clock

An early clock was installed in 1680 by Richard Roe. This was replaced in 1880 by a new clock mechanism by G. & F. Cope of Nottingham.

Incumbents

William Dracot ca.1610 
Mr Lawe ca.1612 
Matthias Watson 1617-1622 
Humphrey Saunders by 1624-1630 
Henry Pratt 1630-1638 
William Evatt 1638-1639 
Ralph Browne ca.1640
Robert Heath 1650-1667 
Mr Ouslay 1667-1668 
Joseph Hawkins 1669-1711 
Edward Hawkins 1711-1716 
Thomas Price 1716-1725 
Gabriel Wayne 1726-1771 
William Kirkby 1772-1782 
Thomas Bigsby 1783-1811 
John Davenport 1812-1827 
John Rolleston 1828-1854 
Thomas Hassall 1854-1856 
Henry Alexander 1859-1874 
William James Bethell Wynn Roberts 1875-1877 
Herbert Guilford Sprigg 1878-1880 
Christopher Rodwell 1880-1882 
Edward St John Morse 1882-1940 
William Wheeler 1944-1946 
Albert Boultby 1946-1948 
Arthur Elwin 1948-1951 
Noel King 1953-1955 
Thomas Warner Richardson 1957-1965 
George John Halsey 1966-1968 
Stephen Chaloner 1969-1973 
Gerald Nettleton Pearce 1973-1984 
Kenneth H. Newcombe 1984-1997 
Neil Weston 1998-2009 
Graeme Anderson 2009-2016

Memorials

 Lady Anne Stanhope, died 1587
 Lady Georgina West, died 1824

Sources

Grade II* listed churches in Nottinghamshire
Church of England church buildings in Nottinghamshire